A cashierless store (also called a till-less store, checkout-free store or Just walk out store) is a store which allows customers to shop their products and leave without having to wait in line and pay at a checkout. Stores use a combination of technologies such as cameras, sensors, computer vision techniques, and deep learning to register which products someone picks up or puts back.

Technology

History

2016
In 2016, Amazon announced Amazon Go, a brick-and-mortar store featuring various technologies to eliminate the checkout. People require the Amazon app (formerly a specific Amazon Go app) to enter the store, shop for whatever they need, and exit to be billed afterwards through their account.

2018
The first Amazon Go store opened in 2018.

2019
In 2019, Sainsbury's opened the first cashierless store in the United Kingdom. However, it was closed a few months later.

2020
In July 2020 a Finnish company called Korttelikauppa opened a cashierless store in Kuninkaantammi, Helsinki.

2021
In January 2021, Hudson announced that they would be implementing Amazon's Just Walk Out technology in select airport convenience stores, branded as Hudson Nonstop.

In March 2021, Delaware North opened two cashierless MRKT convenience stores at TD Garden in Boston. 

In Spring and Summer 2021 Korttelikauppa opened 6 more stores in Helsinki, Espoo and Vantaa.

In September 2021, Carrefour opened the first cashierless store in the Middle East called Carrefour City+, located in the Mall of the Emirates in Dubai. Also in September 2021, Aldi UK opened its first cashierless store in Greenwich.

In October 2021, Tesco introduced its GetGo store in central London, following a small trial of a similar store at the Tesco head office in Welwyn Garden City. That same month, Finnish convenience retailer R-kioski opened a cashierless store called R-kioski Go! in Viikki, Helsinki. With the opening of the Climate Pledge Arena in October 2021, four stores were equipped with Amazon's cashierless technology.

2022
In April 2022, Minute Maid Park in Houston, Texas became the first Major League Baseball stadium to incorporate cashierless stores, installing Amazon's technology at two of its concession stands. Minor-league Polar Park in Worcester, Massachusetts launched similar technology from startup Standard AI in April 2022.

In 2022, Aldi Nord opened the first cashierless store in the Netherlands (in the city of Utrecht), as a 12 month trial.

Amazon introduced its cashierless technology in two Whole Foods stores (in Washington, DC, and Sherman Oaks, California) in 2022.

See also
 Automated retail
 Cashless society
 Technological unemployment

References

Payment methods in retailing
Retail formats